Trombay Thermal Power Station is a coal-based thermal power plant located at Trombay near Mumbai in the Indian state of Maharashtra. The power plant is owned by Tata Power.

Capacity
It has an installed capacity of 1430 MW. It has following generating units:

 150 MW Oil (unit 1 to unit 4).
 500 MW Coal (unit 5).
 500 MW running on oil (unit 6, this is being converted to run on coal).
 180 MW Gas based (unit 7)
 250 MW Coal (unit 8).

The first 4 units have been decommissioned and are no more functional.

References

Coal-fired power stations in Maharashtra
Buildings and structures in Mumbai
Science and technology in Mumbai
Tata Power
Year of establishment missing